Swimmer is the fifth studio album by the musical duo Tennis, released via their own label Mutually Detrimental on February 14, 2020.

Background and release
"Runner" was released as the lead single from the album on November 8, 2019. It was released alongside a music video directed by Luca Venter. Along with the release of "Runner", Tennis announced the album would be titled Swimmer, revealing the album cover and a release date of February 14, 2020. Tour dates for 2020 were also announced.

"Need Your Love" was released as the second single from the album on January 9, 2020, alongside a music video directed by Luca Venter.

"How to Forgive" was released as the third single from the album on January 24, 2020, alongside a visualizer directed and edited by Luca Venter.

Track listing

Personnel
 Alaina Moore – vocals, keyboards, piano, engineering, production
 Patrick Riley – bass, drum programming, guitar, keyboards, engineering, production
 Johnny Payne – string arrangements
 Steve Voss – assistant engineer, drums
 Josh Zubot – strings
 Joe LaPorta – mixing
 Claudius Mittendorfer – mixing
 Luca Venter – artwork

Charts

References

2020 albums
Self-released albums
Tennis (band) albums